Peter Aldag (born 15 March 1965) is a German sailor. He competed in the Finn event at the 1992 Summer Olympics.

References

External links
 
 

1965 births
Living people
German male sailors (sport)
Olympic sailors of Germany
Sailors at the 1992 Summer Olympics – Finn
Sportspeople from Stuttgart